The A. C. Gilruth House, located at 218 Second Ave. NE in Watertown, South Dakota, was built in 1908.  It was listed on the National Register of Historic Places in 1989.

It was deemed significant as "a good example of the smaller homes built in the North End Neighborhood, Watertown, South Dakota, after the turn of the century."

It is a one-and-a-half-story ornamental concrete block masonry (cast stone) structure.

References

Houses on the National Register of Historic Places in South Dakota
Houses completed in 1908
Codington County, South Dakota